The 1994–95 United Systems of Independent Soccer Leagues indoor season was an American soccer season run by the United Systems of Independent Soccer Leagues during the winter of 1994 to 1995.

Regular season

North/South Division

Mid-South Division

South Central Division

Playoffs
Each of the three division winners received automatic entry into the playoffs.   Then, the next two teams with the best records also entered the playoffs.  Finally, the host team, the Tulsa Roughnecks, also entered the playoffs.

Sizzlin’ Six

Final

MVP:

Points leaders

Honors
 Most Valuable Player: Mo Suri
 Top Goal Scorer: Juha Mieteinen
 Top Goalkeeper: Brent Jameson
 Coach of the Year: Charlie Morgan
 Rookie of the Year: Colby Williams

External links
The Year in American Soccer - 1994

References

USISL indoor seasons
United
United